The 1931 Detroit Titans football team represented the University of Detroit in the 1931 college football season. Detroit outscored opponents by a combined total of 112 to 71 and finished with a 7–2–1 record in their seventh year under head coach and College Football Hall of Fame inductee, Gus Dorais. Significant games included victories over Iowa State (20–0), West Virginia (9–7), and Michigan State (20–13), losses to DePaul (12–0) and Fordham(39–9), and a scoreless tie with Villanova.

Schedule

References

External links
 1931 University of Detroit football programs

Detroit
Detroit Titans football seasons
Detroit Titans football
Detroit Titans football